Peter Daniel Steele AM (22 August 1939 – 27 June 2012) was an Australian poet and academic, a member of the Jesuit order and a Catholic priest, who was awarded the Christopher Brennan Award, for lifetime achievement in poetry, in 2010.

Steele was educated at Christian Brothers' College, Perth; Loyola College, Melbourne; the University of Melbourne; Canisius College, Sydney and the Jesuit Theological College, Melbourne.  He was Lockie Fellow at the University of Melbourne and gained an MA and PhD there and joined it English Department in 1966. He later held a Personal Chair in English there and went on to become Emeritus Professor of English at the university. He remained at the university until his death in 2012.

He was much published poet, critic and commentator in books, magazines and journals. He was a Fellow of the Australian Academy of the Humanities and a Visiting Professor at the University of Alberta, at Georgetown University and at Loyola University Chicago.

In 2012 he was made a Member of the Order of Australia (AM), for service to literature and higher education as a poet, author, scholar and teacher, and to the Catholic Church.

Bibliography

Poetry 
Collections
 
 
 Invisible Riders (1999)
 Plenty: Art into Poetry (2003)
 The Whispering Gallery: Art Into Poetry (2006)
 White Knight with Beebox: New and Selected Poems (2008)
 A Local Habitation: Poems and Homilies (2010)
 The Gossip and the Wine (2011)
List of poems

Non-fiction 
 Jonathan Swift: Preacher and Jester (1978)
 The Autobiographical Passion: studies in the self on show (1989)
 
 Bread for the Journey: Homilies (2002) 
 Braiding the Voices: Essays in Poetry (2012)

Obituaries

 Australian Book Review
 The Sydney Morning Herald

Notes

1939 births
2012 deaths
Australian Jesuits
Members of the Order of Australia
20th-century Australian poets
Australian male poets
20th-century Australian male writers
Meanjin people
Quadrant (magazine) people
Writers from Perth, Western Australia
People educated at Christian Brothers' College, Perth
University of Melbourne alumni
Academic staff of the University of Melbourne
People educated at Loyola College